Mira (AK-84) was never commissioned and thus never bore the USS designation. The ship was transferred to become the U.S. Army Corps of Engineers Port Repair ship Robert M. Emery the day after acquisition by Navy.

Construction
The ship, one of 109 Maritime Commission N-type coastal cargo ships built, was laid down under Maritime Commission contract by Penn-Jersey Shipbuilding Corporation, Camden, New Jersey, 22 May 1943 as MV William Nott, a Maritime Commission type N3-M-A1 cargo vessel. The ship was launched 31 October 1943; sponsored by Mrs. Clementine C. O’Brien; acquired by the U.S. Navy 6 November 1943 for service as Mira (AK-84). However, she was never commissioned and was transferred to the Army 7 November 1943. Her name was struck from the Navy list 16 November 1943.

Army career

Mira was renamed Robert M. Emery in 1944 for First Lieutenant Robert M. Emery of the U.S. Army Corps of Engineers serving with the 1st Infantry Division and killed in action on 8 November 1942 in Algeria. Lieutenant Emery was presented the Distinguished Service Cross posthumously for his action on that date. Emery Barracks was also named in his honor.

Robert M. Emery was among the first four of the N3-M-A1 types converted for use as a U.S. Army Corps of Engineers port repair ship. The conversion work was done by Bethlehem Steel Co., Inc., Brooklyn, New York, in mid 1944.

Robert M. Emery joined her three sister ships and the converted Great Lakes steamer Junior N. Van Noy as one of the five ships leaving in late summer of 1944 for operations in Europe. She then began operations at ports in the United Kingdom, North Africa, and France. She was the only member of that group to operate in the Pacific Ocean, going there in July 1945 to operate in the Hawaiian Islands between September and November. Subsequently, she returned to the United States West Coast for transfer to the Maritime Commission. Mira was returned to the Maritime Commission. She eventually was sold for scrapping in 1966.

Civilian usage

Instead of scrapping the ship was sold to Canadian interests in 1966 and towed to Victoria, British Columbia and reportedly docked at the foot of Fort Street until resale in 1969. The U.S. buyers converted the ship to an attraction at Fisherman’s Wharf in San Francisco, California until 1970 when the ship was towed to Astoria, Washington and apparently scrapped in Tacoma, Washington during late 1984.

Notes

References

External links
 United States Army in World War II - The Corps of Engineers: Troops and Equipment - Chapter XVII - Preparing to Reconstruct Ports
 The Corps of Engineers: The War Against Germany: CHAPTER XVI Developing Beaches and Reconstructing Ports
 NavSource Online: Service Ship Photo Archive - AK-84 Mira - USAT Robert M. Emery
 Historia y Arqueología Marítima-Los Buques de la US Maritime Commission-Los buques cargueros tipo N3 (Spanish, with photo of Robert M. Emery as Marine Wonderland, San Francisco, 1969)

 

Port repair ships of the United States Army
Enceladus-class cargo ships
Ships built in Camden, New Jersey
1943 ships
Type N3 ships of the United States Army
World War II auxiliary ships of the United States